The 1996 United States presidential election in New York took place on November 5, 1996, as part of the 1996 United States presidential election. Voters chose 33 representatives, or electors to the Electoral College, who voted for president and vice president.

New York, a reliable blue state that no Republican has won since 1984, was won by incumbent Democratic President Bill Clinton of Arkansas and Vice President Al Gore of Tennessee, over the Republican ticket of Senator Bob Dole of Kansas and Representative Jack Kemp of New York. Clinton carried New York by a landslide 28.86% margin of victory, taking 59.47% of the vote to Dole’s 30.61%, even though Republican vice presidential candidate Jack Kemp was from New York. Reform Party candidate Ross Perot finished in third, with 7.97% of the popular vote.

Clinton improved dramatically on his 1992 showing in New York, when he had won the state with a 49.7% plurality. 1996 firmly entrenched New York’s status in the modern era as a Democratic stronghold, rather than the swing state it had been in the 20th century. Many historically powerfully Republican upstate counties were won by the Democratic ticket: Clinton is alongside Lyndon Johnson in 1964 one of only two Democrats since the Civil War to carry Cattaraugus, Chenango, Delaware, Fulton, Jefferson, Ontario, Schuyler, Yates, Chemung, Herkimer, Lewis, Oneida and Schoharie counties.  The following counties also voted Democratic for the first time since 1964: Clinton, Columbia, Dutchess, Essex, Madison, Orange, Richmond (including Staten Island), Saratoga, Suffolk, Warren and Washington.

In this process of sweeping traditionally Republican suburbs around New York City, Clinton increased his lead in Westchester County – where he later moved in 2000 – from an 8.5% win in 1992 to a 21-point sweep in 1996. Many of these gains would be preserved in future elections: since 1996, no Democratic presidential candidate has received less than 58% of the vote in New York State, and except for George W. Bush in 2004, no Republican has broken 40%. Clinton's 28.86% victory margin is the second widest ever for a Democrat, right behind Lyndon Johnson's 37.25% in 1964, though several subsequent Democrats have received a higher vote share.

Results

Results by county

Counties that flipped from Republican to Democratic
Cattaraugus (Largest city: Olean)
Chemung (Largest city: Elmira)
Chenango (Largest city: Norwich)
Clinton (Largest city: Plattsburgh)
Delaware (Largest city: Sidney)
Dutchess (Largest city: Poughkeepsie)
Essex (Largest city: Ticonderoga)
Fulton (Largest city: Gloversville)
Herkimer (Largest city: German Flatts)
Jefferson (Largest city: Le Ray)
Lewis (Largest city: Lowville)
Madison (Largest city: Oneida)
Oneida (Largest city: Utica)
Ontario (Largest city: Geneva)
Orange (Largest city: Palm Tree)
Oswego (Largest city: Oswego)
Richmond (Coterminous with Staten Island, a borough of New York City)
Saratoga (Largest city: Saratoga Springs)
Schoharie (Largest city: Cobleskill)
Schuyler (Largest city: Watkins Glen)
Suffolk (Largest city: Brookhaven)
Warren (Largest city: Glens Falls)
Washington (Largest city: Hudson Falls)
Yates (Largest city: Penn Yan)

See also
 United States presidential elections in New York
 Presidency of Bill Clinton

Notes

References

New York
1996
1996 New York (state) elections